Nisar Mohmand is a Pakistani politician who was a member of the Provincial Assembly of Khyber Pakhtunkhwa from August 2019 to January 2023.

Political career
Mohmand contested 2019 Khyber Pakhtunkhwa provincial election on 20 July 2019 from constituency PK-103 (Mohmand-I) on the ticket of Awami National Party. He won the election by the majority of 1,464 votes over the runner up Rahim Shah of Pakistan Tehreek-e-Insaf. He garnered 11,064 votes while Shah received 9,600 votes.

References

Living people
Awami National Party MPAs (Khyber Pakhtunkhwa)
Politicians from Khyber Pakhtunkhwa
Year of birth missing (living people)